Mark Keith Robinson (born August 18, 1968) is an American politician serving as the 35th lieutenant governor of North Carolina since 2021. A member of the Republican Party, he is the first African-American to hold the office of lieutenant governor in North Carolina. 

After defeating Democratic nominee Yvonne Lewis Holley in the 2020 lieutenant gubernatorial election, he succeeded Republican Dan Forest, who had made an unsuccessful run for the governorship against incumbent Democrat Roy Cooper. 

Robinson's political career has been characterized by numerous controversial statements. critics have described these statements as homophobic, transphobic, and anti-atheism.

Early life and education
Robinson was born in Greensboro, North Carolina, as the ninth of ten children. Robinson has said that his father was abusive and alcoholic, and that he and his family suffered from domestic violence; Robinson and his siblings lived in foster care for part of their childhood, before moving back in with their mother. After high school, he served in the Army Reserve, then worked at several furniture factories in the Triad region. While working in furniture manufacturing, he took history classes at the University of North Carolina at Greensboro, with the goal of securing a degree and becoming a history teacher.

Political career
Robinson attributed the beginning of his interest in conservative politics to his reading of a book by Rush Limbaugh, after which he "found out that I was conservative and always had been." In April 2018, Robinson attended a meeting of the Greensboro City Council, where they debated whether or not to cancel a gun show in the wake of the Stoneman Douglas High School shooting. Robinson spoke in favor of gun rights, and video of his speech went viral after it was shared on Facebook by Mark Walker. Afterwards, Robinson dropped out of the University of North Carolina at Greensboro and left his job in furniture manufacturing to focus on public speaking engagements. He was invited to speak at the National Rifle Association's annual convention that year.

2020 campaign
Robinson ran in the 2020 election for lieutenant governor of North Carolina. He won the Republican nomination, clearing the 30% threshold to avoid a primary runoff, defeating state senator Andy Wells, superintendent of public instruction Mark Johnson, former congresswoman Renee Ellmers, and former state representative Scott Stone. He faced Democratic nominee Yvonne Lewis Holley in the general election in November, in a race in which either Robinson or Holley would become North Carolina's first African-American lieutenant governor. Robinson was elected, in the process becoming the second black person ever elected to the North Carolina Council of State, after Ralph Campbell Jr.

Robinson's 2020 campaign finance reports contained incomplete information on his campaign contributors. Campaign finance watchdog Bob Hall identified several questionable expenditures in Robinson's campaign reports, including $186 for medical bills and for $2,840 for "campaign clothes and accessories" (most of it spent at a sporting goods shop); the campaign did not explain how these expenditures were campaign-related. Robinson's reports also stated that Robinson's wife spent $4,500 for "campaign clothing" but gave no details. The reports also stated that Robinson withdrew an unexplained $2,400 in cash in apparent violation of a state law requiring all candidate cash payment over $50 to be accompanied by a detailed description explaining of what the money was for. After these expenses came under scrutiny in 2021, Robinson's campaign blamed "clerical errors"; the executive director of the watchdog group Common Cause North Carolina filed a formal complaint with the State Board of Elections over the discrepancies.

Political views and remarks
Robinson promoted his persona as a "brash and unfiltered conservative culture warrior". He opposes abortion, promotes climate change denial, and opposes the legalization of recreational marijuana. He has indicated that he wants to remove science and social studies from first through fifth grade curriculum, abolish the State Board of Education, and expand charter schools and school voucher programs, potentially supplanting the public school system.

Robinson's past anti-Semitic comments have drawn scrutiny and condemnation. He claimed that the Marvel movie Black Panther was "created by an agnostic Jew and put to film by satanic Marxists" that was "only created to pull the shekels out of your Schvartze pockets" (using a Yiddish word for Black). Robinson also appeared at an interview with fringe pastor Sean Moon, who claimed that he planned to become "king of the United States"; in the interview, Moon claimed that the Rothschild family was one of the "four horsemen of the apocalypse" and promoted the anti-Semitic conspiracy theory of a cabal of Jewish "international bankers" who rule every country's central bank. Robinson endorsed Moon's claim as "exactly right". Robinson's statements, as well as his refusal to apologize or retract them, drew much concern from the leaders of North Carolina's Jewish community. He later apologized for the comments about Black Panther, saying his words did not reflect his intended message.

On his Facebook page, which has more than 100,000 followers, Robinson's posts, which have impugned transgender people, Muslims, atheists, former President Barack Obama, and African-Americans who support Democrats, have drawn criticism. Robinson accused people "who support this mass delusion called transgenderism" of seeking "to glorify Satan". Robinson called former President Obama "a worthless, anti-American atheist" and posted "birther" memes; accused American Muslims of being "INVADERS" who "refuse to assimilate to our ways while demanding respect they have not earned"; called Michelle Obama a man; and disparaged Joy Behar and Maxine Waters in crude terms. After the 2016 Pulse nightclub shooting, Robinson wrote that "Homosexuality is STILL an abominable sin and I WILL NOT join in 'celebrating gay pride.'" In 2020, Robinson asserted that the coronavirus was a "globalist" conspiracy to defeat Donald Trump, and dismissed the threat of the COVID-19 pandemic, writing, "The looming pandemic I'm most worried about is SOCIALISM." In 2022, after U.S. House speaker Nancy Pelosi's husband was violently assaulted at home, Robinson made light of the attack and posted conspiracy-theory falsehoods about it.

In 2020, the Charlotte Observer editorial board described Robinson's posts as "cringeworthy" and "an embarrassment" while the state Democratic Party called them "homophobic, anti-Semitic, and downright unhinged." Robinson's posts were also criticized by Equality North Carolina and Jewish community leaders in North Carolina. Robinson declined to apologize for his posts, saying, "I'm not ashamed of anything that I post."

Tenure
Robinson was sworn in on January 9, 2021. During his tenure Robinson has had a fraught relationship with Democratic Governor Roy Cooper; Robinson described communication between the two as "nonexistent". As lieutenant governor, the constitution prescribed that Robinson served as acting governor when Cooper left the state, though Cooper regularly did not inform Robinson on his departures.

After swearing into office, Robinson began focusing on education issues, particularly with regards to the appropriateness of instructional and reading materials available to children enrolled in schools. On March 26, 2021, he launched the FACTS (Fairness, Accountability in the Classroom for Teachers and Students) Task Force through his office's website. The 12-member task force was to field reports of political bias in instruction in public schools. The task force was later expanded to 15 members. The task force did not comply with the state open meeting law by maintaining records of its meetings or transactions. The lieutenant governor's general counsel argued that the task force was not obligated to do so as it was not a "public body" and existed only to advise the lieutenant governor's office. The chief attorney of the General Assembly's Legislative Analysis Division disagreed, saying that the board met the criteria under state law for being considered a public body. Further ambiguity surrounded the task force's legal status as state law did not explicitly authorize or prohibit the lieutenant governor from creating their own official boards. 

The body released a report on summitted complaints in late August 2021. Some complaints pertained to allegedly biased lesson plans and instructional materials, while others directly attacked the task force itself as a fishing expedition and a waste of resources. That month Robinson pushed for the adoption of a bill in the legislature which sought to prevent teachers from compelling students to adhere to 13 specific beliefs, including notions that one race or sex is superior to others.

In a June 2021 speech at a Seagrove, North Carolina church, Robinson disparaged "transgenderism and homosexuality" as "filth", saying: "There's no reason anybody anywhere in America should be telling any child about transgenderism, homosexuality, any of that filth. And yes I called it filth. And if you don't like that I called it filth, come see me and I'll explain it to you." In the same speech, he called for an end to the separation of church and state in public schools. In October 2021, after Robinson's speech was brought to light by Right Wing Watch, Democratic state senator Jeff Jackson called for Robinson to resign, and Governor Roy Cooper's office said that "It's abhorrent to hear anyone, and especially an elected official, use hateful rhetoric that hurts people and our state's reputation." North Carolina Attorney General Josh Stein made similar comments. The Biden administration, in a White House Press Office statement, condemned Robinson's words as "repugnant and offensive" and said that a leader's role is "to bring people together and stand up for the dignity and rights of everyone; not to spread hate and undermine their own office." The following month, Robinson said that heterosexual couples are "superior" to gay couples because the latter cannot conceive a child together. Robinson compared homosexuality to cow manure, maggots, and flies, explaining that the latter all serve a purpose in God's creation; whereas, with homosexuality, Robinson remarked, "If homosexuality is of God, what purpose does it serve? What does it make? What does it create? It creates nothing."

Personal life
Robinson married his wife, Yolanda, in 1990. They had a child in 1990 and another in 1992. They live in High Point, North Carolina. Robinson had filed for bankruptcy on three occasions, has been sued for payments, and had liens placed on him by the Internal Revenue Service as recently as 2012. He stated in 2020 that any outstanding issues with the IRS had been "taken care of".

In a 2012 social media post, Robinson acknowledged that in 1989, he paid for a woman that he impregnated to get an abortion. In 2022, Robinson clarified that the woman in question was his eventual wife, Yolanda.

Electoral history

See also 
 List of minority governors and lieutenant governors in the United States
 List of lieutenant governors of North Carolina

References

External links

|-

 

1968 births
African-American people in North Carolina politics
American gun rights activists
Black conservatism in the United States
Christian nationalists
Discrimination against LGBT people in the United States
Far-right politicians in the United States
Lieutenant Governors of North Carolina
Living people
North Carolina Republicans
Politicians from Greensboro, North Carolina
Military personnel from North Carolina
United States Army reservists
University of North Carolina at Greensboro alumni
American conspiracy theorists
21st-century African-American people
20th-century African-American people
Anti-LGBT sentiment
Grimsley High School alumni